Judy Corbalis is a novelist and short story writer from New Zealand.

She graduated from the University of East Anglia in 1991. She serves on the advisory council of the UK Friends of the National Museum of Women in the Arts.

Bibliography
 The Wrestling Princess and other stories (1986)
The Cuckoo Bird (1988)
Oskar and the Ice-pick (1988)
Porcellus, the Flying Pig (1988)
The Ice Cream Heroes (1989)
Your Dad's a Monkey (1989)
Flying Pig to the Rescue (1991)
Put a Sock in It, Percy (1994)
Tapu (1996)
Mortmain (2007)

References

External links
 Royal Literary Fund
Fantastic Fiction UK

Year of birth missing (living people)
Living people
Alumni of the University of East Anglia
New Zealand women novelists
New Zealand women short story writers
20th-century New Zealand novelists
21st-century New Zealand novelists
21st-century New Zealand women writers
20th-century New Zealand short story writers
21st-century New Zealand short story writers
20th-century New Zealand women writers